Jana Zvěřinová (born 9 March 1937) is a Czechoslovak retired slalom canoeist who competed at the international level from 1961 to 1969.

She won five medals at the ICF Canoe Slalom World Championships with three silvers (Folding K1 team: 1963; K1 team: 1967, 1969) and two bronzes (folding K1: 1963, K1: 1969).

References

Czech female canoeists
Czechoslovak female canoeists
Living people
1937 births
Medalists at the ICF Canoe Slalom World Championships